The 2014–15 season was Sepahan's 14th season in the Pro League, and their 21st consecutive season in the top division of Iranian Football and 61st year in existence as a football club. They competed in the Hazfi Cup. Sepahan was captained by Moharram Navidkia.

Players
Last updated on 22 November 2014

Transfers 
Last updated on 12 July 2014

Summer 

In:

Out:

Winter 

In:

Out:

Technical staff

|}

Statistics
Last updated on 30 July 2014

Players performance

Disciplinary record

Clean sheets

Own goals

Overall statistics

Competitions

Overall

Iran Pro League

Standings

Results summary

Results by round

Matches

Hazfi Cup

Friendly Matches

See also
 2015 AFC Champions League
 2014–15 Iran Pro League
 2014–15 Hazfi Cup

References

External links
Iran Premier League Statistics
Persian League

Sepahan S.C. seasons
Sepahan